

Northern Transvaal results in the 1990 Currie cup

Statistics

1990 Currie cup log position

1988 - 1990 results summary (including play off matches)

Northern Transvaal
1990